Praise the Beast is the fourth studio album by Polish death metal band Azarath. It was released on 25 May 2009 by Agonia Records. It was also released on American label Deathgasm Records.

The drums for the album were recorded at RG Studio in Gdańsk, Poland during September 2008. The guitars and bass were recorded at Progresja Studio in Warsaw during October 2008. The vocals and solos, as well as mixing and mastering for the album, were done at Sounds Great Promotion Studio in Gdynia, Poland between January and March 2009.

Track listing
All music composed by Bart and Inferno. All lyrics written by Baal Ravenlock.

Credits

References

2009 albums
Azarath (band) albums